The 1944 Cotton Bowl Classic was a postseason college football bowl game between the fourteenth ranked Texas Longhorns and the Randolph Field Ramblers, a military institution squad from San Antonio, TX.

Background
Randolph boasted many former college football stars, most notably Tulsa's Glenn Dobbs, who had 1,867 all purpose yards for the year with 1,431 passing and 421 yards rushing. He was also their punter, with a 40.2 average per kick.

Martin Ruby became the first and only player to play on two different Cotton Bowl teams, having played in the 1942 Cotton Bowl Classic. He was named outstanding player in both games.

Game summary
The game was played in a cold, steady rain described by Bible as the worst he had ever seen. Tex Aulds scored for Randolph on a touchdown catch from Glenn Dobbs. But Texas rallied back with a George McCall touchdown catch from Ralph Ellsworth to tie the game. The game stayed that way due to defense that allowed 260 yards combined from both teams.

Statistics

Attendance
32,000 tickets were sold for the game but only 15,000 spectators came to the game because of the weather.

References

Cotton Bowl
Cotton Bowl Classic
Randolph Field Ramblers football
Texas Longhorns football bowl games
Cotton Bowl
January 1944 sports events